The Primetime Emmy Award for Outstanding Documentary or Nonfiction Special is handed out annually at the Creative Arts Emmy Award ceremony. The category was called Outstanding Nonfiction Special prior to 2013 and Outstanding Informational Special before 1998.

Winners and nominations

1990s

2000s

2010s

2020s

Total awards by network

 HBO – 11
 PBS – 5
 History – 3
 Netflix – 2
 Apple TV+ - 1
 CBS – 1
 Discovery – 1

References

Documentary or Nonfiction Special
American reality television series
Awards established in 1998